The Foreshore Freeway Bridge, also known as Cape Town's Unfinished Bridge, is an incomplete section of what was intended to be the Eastern Boulevard Highway in the city bowl of Cape Town, South Africa. Conceptualised and designed in the late 1960s, work began in the early 1970s with the freeway aimed at alleviating future traffic congestion in the city expected in the years to come. However, due to budget constraints in city expenditure at the time, the project never came to completion and has stood in its unfinished state since construction officially ended in 1977. While there has been much speculation in local press over the years regarding the freeway's eventual conclusion, the city council has yet to come to a decision regarding the matter. The structure has become somewhat of a tourist attraction over the years and is also a popular movie and fashion shoot location.

History

During the 1940s and 1950s the planners and engineers of Cape Town were wrapped up in discussions about proposed road infrastructure on the city's Foreshore and as various alternatives were debated, tensions between National, Provincial, the City government and the Foreshore Board surfaced. Solomon "Solly" Simon Morris was the City Engineer at the time who proposed relocating Eastern and Western Boulevards and including a ring highway to "allow for circulation with as little disturbance as possible and a speedy entrance and exit". In doing so, Morris was further instilling the popular post-War sentiment of a future associated with faster cars and bigger highways. Construction on the project eventually got off the ground in the early 1970s but was brought to an abrupt halt in 1977 with no clear explanation given at the time. As a result, several urban legends have surfaced over the years. One is that the design team had made a calculation error resulting in the two ends failing to link up. Another was that construction was halted due to a disgruntled shop owner who refused to sell his property that stood where the flyover would pass. However, the official explanation to date is that the city had run out of money with traffic numbers at the time not justifying its continuation and the project had to be abandoned.

Description

Originally intended as a freeway, the uncompleted bridge or overpass consists of two parallel units - each designed to carry one direction of motor traffic over the city's Central business district (CBD) at north entrance, to avoid the many intersections below. Both lanes on the western side were tarred, and road markings were painted right up to where the bridge stops, which is still visible on Google Earth. On the eastern side, approximately  
away, the other two ends that would have made the connection jut out and have since been converted to public parking. At the 2012 launch of the Transport for Cape Town initiative, the Dean of the Faculty of Engineering and the Built Environment at the University of Cape Town, Professor Francis Petersen, announced a partnership between the City of Cape Town and the University to examine the future of the incomplete foreshore freeway. In 2015 the city council also started using the western top deck as a designated parking area. During the 2010 World Cup Soccer tournament hosted by South Africa, the world's largest operational vuvuzela sponsored by Hyundai was mounted on the western side and meant to sound at the start of each game. The city council, however, decided not to use it as the jarring sound and volume level was a cause of concern.

Future prospects

The Transport for Cape Town initiative announced in 2012 sought the input of design students at the University of Cape Town to find an affordable solution to the unfinished bridge and during a presentation on April 14, 2014 at the Cape Town City Hall approximately 600 students exhibited their ideas. Some of these included planting trees on the overpass, turning it into a roller coaster or skate park, creating a street arcade below and also possibly some sort of waterway. Mayor Patricia de Lille, present at the exhibition said "it was important to use Cape Town's designation as World Design Capital as an opportunity to think differently". Once the exhibition closed UCT handed the students' projects over to the Transport for Cape Town committee for evaluation with a decision yet to be announced.

See also 
 List of regional routes in South Africa

References

External links 

 Future Foreshore Freeway Precinct
 South African National Roads Agency
 The Peninsula Expressway

Bridges in South Africa
Unfinished buildings and structures
History of South Africa
Transport in Cape Town